Andrey Golubev and Aleksandr Nedovyesov were the defending champions but chose not to defend their title.

Grégoire Barrère and Albano Olivetti won the title after defeating James Cerretani and Marc-Andrea Hüsler 5–7, 7–6(9–7), [10–8] in the final.

Seeds

Draw

References

External links
 Main draw

Open Quimper Bretagne - Doubles
2021 Doubles